Ox tongue may refer to:

 Beef tongue
 Picris (oxtongues), especially Picris echioides, the bristly ox-tongue
 Fistulina hepatica, ox tongue fungus
 Ox tongue spear